John Hunter Bell (born 20 October 1997) is a Scottish actor. He has played Bain in two instalments of  The Hobbit film series, "Young Ian" Murray in the Starz television series Outlander, Angus in Battleship, Helius in Wrath of the Titans and Toby Coleman in Tracy Beaker Returns.

Career
Bell made his television debut as Creet in Doctor Who's 2007 episode "Utopia", after he won the role in a Blue Peter competition. Two years later he portrayed the lead role of Connor in award winning director Chris Roche's short film Transit. That same year Bell would star as young orphan Tomas in his first feature length film A Shine of Rainbows. From 2009 to 2010 he portrayed Anthony Weaver in BBC One's comedy series Life of Riley and from 2010 to 2011 he starred as Toby Coleman in the BAFTA winning children's television series, Tracy Beaker Returns.

In 2011 Bell appeared in BBC's made for TV movie Hattie as Robin Le Mesurier. In July 2011 he was named, by the now defunct youth casting website Screenterrier, as one of the top 12 British rising stars. The next year he portrayed Helius in the fantasy film Wrath of the Titans and Angus in the science fiction war film Battleship. He then appeared as Billy Bempsy in the History Channel's mini series Hatfields & McCoys. 2013 saw Bell portray Bain, son of Bard the Bowman, in Peter Jackson's epic adventure fantasy films The Hobbit: The Desolation of Smaug. He would revive the role in 2014's The Hobbit: The Battle of the Five Armies, the final instalment of Jackson's interpretation of J.R.R. Tolkien's novel The Hobbit. Between the two films, he would portray Jamie Carr in a 2013 episode of ITV's long running series Midsomer Murders. Bell also portrayed Niki in Evergreen Production's 2015 post WWII drama The Man in the Box, though the film has yet to be released.

Bell portrays Ian Murray in STARZ's time travel series Outlander. His character first appeared in episode six of season three entitled "A. Malcolm".

In early 2022 Bell headlined the revival of Obie winner David Drake's Off-Broadway one-man show The Night Larry Kramer Kissed Me. The play, set amidst the AIDS epidemic in America, is set to run through February of 2022 at London's New Wimbledon Theatre.

Personal life 
Bell is gay. As a child actor, he worked alongside celebrated gay male actors, which helped him feel accepted in the industry.

Filmography

Film

Television

Theatre

Audio drama

References

External links

1997 births
21st-century Scottish male actors
Living people
Male actors from Paisley, Renfrewshire
Scottish male child actors
Scottish male film actors
Scottish male television actors
Scottish male voice actors
Scottish gay actors